The following entries cover events related to birding and ornithology which occurred in the listed year.

1800s

1800   1801   1802   1803   1804   1805   1806   1807   1808   1809
1810   1811   1812   1813   1814   1815   1816   1817   1818   1819
1820   1821   1822   1823   1824   1825   1826   1827   1828   1829
1830   1831   1832   1833   1834   1835   1836   1837   1838   1839
1840   1841   1842   1843   1844   1845   1846   1847   1848   1849
1850   1851   1852   1853   1854   1855   1856   1857   1858   1859
1860   1861   1862   1863   1864   1865   1866   1867   1868   1869
1870   1871   1872   1873   1874   1875   1876   1877   1878   1879
1880   1881   1882   1883   1884   1885   1886   1887   1888   1889
1890   1891   1892   1893   1894   1895   1896   1897   1898   1899

1900s

1900   1901   1902   1903   1904   1905   1906   1907   1908   1909
1910   1911   1912   1913   1914   1915   1916   1917   1918   1919
1920   1921   1922   1923   1924   1925   1926   1927   1928   1929
1930   1931   1932   1933   1934   1935   1936   1937   1938   1939
1940   1941   1942   1943   1944   1945   1946   1947   1948   1949
1950   1951   1952   1953   1954   1955   1956   1957   1958   1959
1960   1961   1962   1963   1964   1965   1966   1967   1968   1969
1970   1971   1972   1973   1974   1975   1976   1977   1978   1979
1980s   1981   1982   1983   1984   1985   1986   1987   1988   1989
1990   1991   1992   1993   1994   1995   1996   1997   1998   1999

2000s

2000   2001   2002   2003   2004   2005 2006   2007   2008   2009
2010   2011   2012 
2013   2014  2015 2016   2017   2018   2019
2020   2021   2022